Prytanes is a genus of dirt-colored seed bugs in the family Rhyparochromidae. There are about 17 described species in Prytanes.

Species
These 17 species belong to the genus Prytanes:

 Prytanes albomaculata (Distant, 1893) c g
 Prytanes caeca (Distant, W.L., 1882) c g
 Prytanes confusa (Barber, H.G., 1953) c g
 Prytanes confusus (Barber, 1953) i b
 Prytanes cubensis Barber, H.G., 1954 c g
 Prytanes dissimilis (Barber, 1953) i c g b
 Prytanes foeda (Stal, C., 1858) c g
 Prytanes formosus (Distant, 1882) i c g
 Prytanes fuscicornis (Stål, 1874) i c g b
 Prytanes globosus Distant, 1893 i c g
 Prytanes intercisa (Barber, H.G., 1932) c g
 Prytanes intercisus (Barber, 1932) i
 Prytanes minima (Guérin-Méneville, 1857) c g
 Prytanes oblonga (Stal, C., 1862) c g
 Prytanes oblongus (Stål, 1862) i b
 Prytanes plebeius (Spinola, M., 1852) c g
 Prytanes tumens (Stal, C., 1874) c g

Data sources: i = ITIS, c = Catalogue of Life, g = GBIF, b = Bugguide.net

References

External links

Rhyparochromidae
Articles created by Qbugbot